The Bert Newton Show was an Australian television series which aired from 1959 to 1960. Aired at 6:30PM Saturdays on Melbourne station GTV-9, it was aimed at teenagers and featured acts lip-syncing their songs.

It competed with the popular ABC series Six O'Clock Rock and HSV-7's Swallow's Juniors. It was preceded on GTV's line-up by Laurel and Hardy and followed by Pick a Box. In 1960, it moved to Thursdays and became Hi-Fi Club, running for several more months.

Episode status
An excerpt of Hi-Fi Club (which looks like a kinescoped film transfer of a video-tape or vice versa) appears on YouTube suggesting that episode or episodes are still extant, although exactly how much footage still exists is unknown. An episode under the title The Bert Newton Show is held by the National Film and Sound Archive

References

External links

Seven Network original programming
Nine Network original programming
Australian music television series
1959 Australian television series debuts
1960 Australian television series endings
1989 Australian television series debuts
Pop music television series
English-language television shows
Black-and-white Australian television shows